Morske or Morskoye is a village in the Sudak Municipality of the Crimea, a territory recognized by a majority of countries as part of Ukraine and annexed by Russia as the Republic of Crimea.

Previously, the settlement was known as the Kapsikhor village. Following the forced deportation of the Crimean Tatars in 1944, the Presidium of the Supreme Soviet of the Russian SFSR published a decree on May 18, 1948, renaming the settlement along with many others throughout Crimea from their native Crimean Tatar names to their current variants.

Its population was 2,245 in the 2001 Ukrainian census. The current population is  The remains of the Choban-Kule fortification are located near the settlement.

References

Villages in Crimea
Sudak Municipality
Populated coastal places in Ukraine
Feodosiysky Uyezd